Spirit Mountain Casino is a Native American casino located in Grand Ronde, Oregon, United States on Oregon Route 18.  It is operated by the Confederated Tribes of the Grand Ronde Community of Oregon, and was created to "enhance economic self-sufficiency opportunities for the Confederated Tribes of Grand Ronde, its members and surrounding communities; to promote economic diversification by the Tribes: to support a variety of housing, educational and cultural programs under the direction of Tribal Council".  It is the state's busiest tourist attraction, drawing three million visitors a year.

The casino's amenities include a 254-room hotel,  of gaming floors, five restaurants, live entertainment and other special events.  Games include 2000 slot machines, blackjack, craps, poker, pai gow poker, roulette, and keno.

Notable performers
 2017: Billy Ray Cyrus
 2015: Ron White
 2014: Wanda Sykes, Callaghan, Ashley Monroe, Chicago, Delta Rae, Kellie Pickler, Will Hoge, Herman's Hermits, Bill Engvall, Craig Cambell, Bret Michaels
 2013: Keith Sweat, Bob Newhart, America, George Lopez, Three Dog Night, The Golden Boys, Kool & The Gang, Ron White, Brian Setzer
 2012: The Isley Brothers, Tanya Tucker, Lonestar, Randy Travis, Tony Bennett, Don Rickles, Toni Braxton, Boyz II Men, Neil Sedaka, Dana Carvey, Merle Haggard, Smokey Robinson, Bill Engvall, Wanda Sykes, 38 Special, Dennis DeYoung, Boz Scaggs, Sugar Ray, Chris Isaak

Spirit Mountain Community Fund
Six percent of the profits from the casino goes to the Spirit Mountain Community Fund (SMCF) and are in turn donated to organizations in western Oregon, an area which includes eleven counties:  Clackamas, Multnomah, Washington, Tillamook, Lincoln, Yamhill, Polk, Marion, Benton, Linn, and Lane.  Since 1998, the SMCF has also funded the Mark O. Hatfield Fellowship to enable a Native American to serve as a staff member to a member of the U.S. Congressional Delegation from Oregon.

See also
Gambling in Oregon
List of casinos in Oregon

References

External links 
 Spirit Mountain Casino (official website)
 Spirit Mountain Community Fund
 Confederated Tribes of Grand Ronde

Casinos in Oregon
Confederated Tribes of the Grand Ronde Community
Native American casinos
Buildings and structures in Polk County, Oregon
Sports venues in Oregon
Music venues in Oregon
Tourist attractions in Polk County, Oregon
1995 establishments in Oregon
Casinos completed in 1995
Casino hotels
Native American history of Oregon